Below is the all time medal table for Summer Asian Games from 1951 to 2018. This does not include the medals won at the Asian Winter Games and other events hosted by the Olympic Council of Asia (OCA).

Games

Medals

NOCs with medals

NOCs without medals

Ranked medal table

See also
 All-time Asian Para Games medal table
 All-time Asian Winter Games medal table

References

External links
 OCA: Asian Games
 Asian Summer Games Medal Count

Summer